The speaker of the Croatian Parliament (literally the president of the Croatian Parliament) is the presiding officer in the Croatian Parliament, Croatia's legislative body.

Under Article 97 of the constitution of Croatia, the speaker of the Croatian Parliament is the only constitutional deputy to the president of Croatia and serves as acting president if the elected president vacates the office before the expiration of the five-year presidential term due to either death, resignation or removal from office (as determined by the Constitutional Court). In this case an early presidential election must be held within 60 days of the vacancy in the presidency having occurred and the speaker shall serve as acting president until the newly elected president is sworn in for a full five-year term of office.

Under the same article of the Constitution, the president of Croatia may unilaterally choose to temporarily delegate authority to the speaker of the Parliament for shorts periods of time, such as whenever the president is not present in the country, is ill, or is on vacation, until the president  wishes to fully resume authority once again. However, in case of longer periods of the president's illness or incapacitation, and especially in those cases when the president is not able to delegate authority to speaker, the responsibility of determining when a speaker should assume or renounce temporary authority rests upon the Constitutional Court, which acts upon the recommendation of the government of Croatia.

The incumbent speaker of the Croatian Parliament is Gordan Jandroković of the Croatian Democratic Union (HDZ), having taken office on 5 May 2017 following the resignation of the previous speaker.

Duties and competences
According to the Croatian Constitution and the Parliamentary Rules of Procedure (Standing Orders of the Croatian Parliament), president of the Parliament:

shall substitute for the president of the Republic if the latter is prevented from performing his/her duties
represents Parliament
convenes and presides over sessions of Parliament
submits motions from authorised sponsors for stipulated procedures
proposes the agenda for sessions of Parliament
handles the procedures for the enactment of laws and other regulations
co-ordinates the activities of working bodies
signs laws and other regulations enacted by Parliament
directs enacted laws to the president of the Republic for proclamation
manages relations between Parliament and the Government
co-signs decisions on the appointment of the prime minister and the appointment of members of the Government
accepts sponsorships ex-officio
approves, taking into account available funds, the travel of parliamentary deputies when they have been invited, as parliamentary deputies, to *visit another state or foreign organisation
co-ordinates the work of standing delegations of Parliament in international parliamentary and other institutions
determines, at the proposal of deputy clubs, the composition of temporary delegations of Parliament in visits to foreign representative bodies and *organisations, such that they generally correspond to the party structure of Parliament and reflect the appropriate representation of both sexes
determines the composition of temporary delegations in cases when he/she is invited abroad as the speaker of Parliament
designates representatives of Parliament at ceremonial and other occasions, adhering to the representation of both sexes
submits a request, at the proposal of the Secretary of Parliament, for the securing of funds for the work of Parliament and the Parliamentary Staff Service
ensures the protection of the rights and exercise of the duties of parliamentary deputies
presides over the oaths of elected and appointed officials, when specified by law and Standing Orders of the Parliament
performs other activities determined by the Constitution of the Republic of Croatia, law and Standing Orders of the Parliament

List
This is the list of speakers of the Croatian Parliament.

Statistics

See also
Speaker of the Chamber of Counties of Croatia
President of Croatia
List of presidents of Croatia
Prime Minister of Croatia
List of Croatian prime ministers by time in office
List of cabinets of Croatia
Secretary of the League of Communists of Croatia
List of heads of state of Yugoslavia
Prime Minister of Yugoslavia
Politics of Croatia

Notes

References

Lists of political office-holders in Croatia
Croatian
Lists of members of parliament
1990 establishments in Croatia